Cain XVIII is a 1963 film from the Soviet Union, adapted from Evgeny Shvarts' play, Two friends.  The Soviet film industry reported that 21.7 million spectators saw the film.

Plot

A famous inventor ("The Professor") creates an extra-powerful weapon—an explosive mosquito. King Cain XVIII dreams of conquering the world and marrying the princess, but she is also loved by Yan, a vagrant musician. Yan's love leads him to surmount many obstacles and simultaneously thwart the insidious plans of the king.

Cast
 Erast Garin as King Cain XVIII
 Lidiya Sukharevskaya as Queen Vlasta
 Mikhail Zharov as Minister of War
 Yuri Lyubimov as First Minister
 Alexander Demyanenko as Ian
 Stanislav Khitrov as Jean
 Rina Zelyonaya as Foreign Governess
 Alexandr Beniaminov as Professor
 Bruno Freindlich as Chief of Secret Police
 Georgi Vitsin as Freelance Hangman
 Boris Chirkov as Lavatory Worker
 Igor Dmitriev as General
 Glikeriya Bogdanova-Chesnokova as First Dame
 Marina Polbentseva as Professor's Wife
 Nikolay Trofimov as Agent 214
 Anatoly Korolkevich as Agent with a carnation

External links

 In ru.wikiquote
 Yuri Lyubimov about film

1963 films
1963 comedy films
1960s Russian-language films
Lenfilm films
Films based on works by Evgeny Shvarts
Soviet comedy films
Russian comedy films
Films directed by Nadezhda Kosheverova
Films based on fairy tales